The 2014 S.League was the 19th season since the establishment of the S.League, the top-flight Singaporean professional league for association football clubs. The league was also known as the Great Eastern Yeo's S.League due to sponsorship reasons. Tampines Rovers were the defending champions.

For the first time, free-to-air MediaCorp okto broadcast all Friday matches that were held at the Jalan Besar Stadium live on its channel, including a weekly S.League Show. The season started on 21 February 2014, and concluded on 31 October 2014.

Teams
A total of 12 teams contested the league. There were no changes to the participating sides from the previous season. Albirex Niigata (S), DPMM FC and Harimau Muda B were invited foreign clubs from Japan, Brunei and Malaysia respectively.

Stadiums and locations

Geylang International used the Jalan Besar stadium to host Balestier Khalsa on 31 July

Personnel and kits
Note: Flags indicate national team as has been defined under FIFA eligibility rules. Players may hold more than one non-FIFA nationality.

 The S.League uses a new match ball, the Mikasa SL450, sponsored by Mikasa.

Managerial changes

Foreign players
Each club is allowed to have up to a maximum of five foreign players.

 Albirex Niigata (S) and Harimau Muda B are an all-Japanese and all-Malaysian team respectively and do not hire any foreigners.
 Players in bold are marquee player signings who command wages outside the monthly salary cap.

League table

Results

Matchweek 1–22

Matchday 23 - 27

Season statistics

Goalscorers

Hat-tricks

4 Player scored 4 goals

Clean sheets

Player

Club

S-League Awards Night Winners

References

External links
 Official site

Singapore Premier League seasons
1
Sing
Sing